In qualification for the 2007 Rugby World Cup, thirteen Asian Rugby Football Union (ARFU) nations compete for one full place, and one repechage place (Repechage 2, against Oceania 3). No Asian teams qualified for the quarter finals in 2003, so none qualify automatically in 2007. Only Japan has been to the World Cup, participating in all five RWCs to date, with only one win in 1991 (England) against Zimbabwe, 52–8. Asia 1 will go into Group B with Australia, Wales, Fiji and Canada.

Qualification process
Initial pools were based on results from 2003–04 ARFU Asian Rugby Series as given below, and was part of 2005 ARFU Asian Rugby Series

Thus initial division allocations for 2005 were:

Round 1a
Division 1 play off for placings, all three teams going into Round 2, along with the winner and runner up of Division 2. The winners of Divisions 3A and 3B go into Round 1b.

Round 1b
The winners of Divisions 3A and 3B playoff (home and away) for the final place in Round 2.

Round 2
The round was part of 2006 ARFU Asian Rugby Series (first and second divisions).

The top two teams from Division 1 and the winner of Division 2 form the new Division 1 (2006). Third place from Division 1, the runner up of Division 2, and the playoff winner from Round 1b form the new Division 2 (2006). The winner and runner up of Division 1 (2006), and the winner of Division 2 (2006), go through to Round 3.

Round 3
The three qualifiers from the previous round form a new Division 1. The winner goes to World Cup 2007 as Asia 1. The runner up plays off against Oceania 3 for Repechage 2.

Round 1a – 2005 
Home OR Away basis.

Pool A (Division 1 2005)
All three teams go through to Round 2 – the winner and runner up into Division 1 (2006), third place into Division 2 (2006).
Final Standings

{| class="wikitable"
|-
!width=30|Pos.
!width=100|Team
!width=30|P
!width=30|W
!width=30|D
!width=30|Lost
!width=30|For
!width=30|Ag.
!width=40|Diff.
!width=30|Points
!width=300|Notes
|-
|- bgcolor=#ccffcc align=center
|1||align=left|||2||2||0||0||141||34||+107||4||
|- bgcolor=#ccffcc align=center
|2||align=left|||2||1||0||1||87||53||+34||2||
|- bgcolor=#ccffcc align=center
|3||align=left|||2||0||0||2||6||147||-141||0||
|}

Pool B (Division 2 2005)
The top two teams go through to Round 2, the winner (Arabian Gulf) into Division 1 (2006), the runner up (China) into Division 2 (2006). 

{| class="wikitable"
|-
!width=30|Pos.
!width=100|Team
!width=30|P
!width=30|W
!width=30|D
!width=30|Lost
!width=30|For
!width=30|Ag.
!width=40|Diff.
!width=30|Points
!width=300|Notes
|-
|- bgcolor=#ccffcc align=center
|1||align=left|Arabian Gulf||2||2||0||0||54||48||+6||4||  promoted to second round
|- bgcolor=#ccffcc align=center
|2||align=left|||2||1||0||1||44||43||+1||2||   promoted to second round 
|- bgcolor=#ffffff align=center
|3||align=left|||2||0||0||2||45||52||-7||0||  
|}

Division 3 Pool A (2005)
Sri Lanka qualifies for home and away playoff (Round 1b) against winner of Division 3 Pool B (Kazakhstan).
{| class="wikitable"
|-
!width=30|Pos.
!width=100|Team
!width=30|P
!width=30|W
!width=30|D
!width=30|Lost
!width=30|For
!width=30|Ag.
!width=40|Diff.
!width=30|Points
!width=300|Notes
|-
|- bgcolor=#ccffcc align=center
|1||align=left|||2||2||0||0||82||55||+27||4||  promoted for play off
|- bgcolor=#ffffff align=center
|2||align=left|||2||1||0||1||64||61||+3||2||
|- bgcolor=#ffffff align=center
|3||align=left|||2||0||0||2||65||95||-30||0||
|}

Division 3 Pool B (2005)
Kazakhstan qualifies for home and away playoff (Round 1b) against winner Division 3 Pool A (Sri Lanka).

{| class="wikitable"
|-
!width=30|Pos.
!width=100|Team
!width=30|P
!width=30|W
!width=30|D
!width=30|Lost
!width=30|For
!width=30|Ag.
!width=40|Diff.
!width=30|Points
!width=300|Notes
|-
|- bgcolor=#ccffcc align=center
|1||align=left|||3||3||0||0||135||31||+104||6||  promoted to play off
|- bgcolor=#ffffff align=center
|2||align=left|||3||1||1||1||78||56||+22||3||
|- bgcolor=#ffffff align=center
|3||align=left|||3||1||0||2||60||111||-51||2||
|- bgcolor=#ffffff align=center
|4||align=left|||3||0||1||2||29||104||-75||1|| 
|}

Round 1b – October 2005 
{| class="wikitable"
|-
!width=30|Pos.
!width=100|Team
!width=30|P
!width=30|W
!width=30|D
!width=30|Lost
!width=30|For
!width=30|Ag.
!width=40|Diff.
!width=30|Points
!width=300|Notes
|-
|- bgcolor=#ccffcc align=center
|1||align=left|||2||1||0||1||43||37||+6||2||  promoted to second round
|- bgcolor=#ffffff align=center
|2||align=left|||2||1||0||1||37||43||-6||2||
|- bgcolor=#ffffCC align=center
|}

Round 2 – April – May 2006 
Home OR Away basis. Top two teams from Division 1 of 2006 ARFU Asian Rugby Series (Japan, Korea) and top team from Division 2 (Hong Kong) go through to round 3.

Division 1 (2006)
{| class="wikitable"
|-
!width=30|Pos.
!width=100|Team
!width=30|P
!width=30|W
!width=30|D
!width=30|Lost
!width=30|For
!width=30|Ag.
!width=40|Diff.
!width=30|Points
!width=300|Notes
|-
|- bgcolor=#ccffcc align=center
|1||align=left|||2||2||0||0||132||23||+109||4|| Qualified to round 3 
|- bgcolor=#ccffcc align=center
|2||align=left|||2||1||0||1||34||55||-21||2|| Qualified to round 3 
|- bgcolor=#ffffff align=center
|3||align=left|Arabian Gulf||2||0||0||2||14||102||-88||0||
|}

Division 2 (2006)
{| class="wikitable"
|-
!width=30|Pos.
!width=100|Team
!width=30|P
!width=30|W
!width=30|D
!width=30|Lost
!width=30|For
!width=30|Ag.
!width=40|Diff.
!width=30|Points
!width=300|Notes
|-
|- bgcolor=#ccffcc align=center
|1||align=left|||2||2||0||0||65||21||+44||4|| Qualified to round 3 
|- bgcolor=#ffffff align=center
|2||align=left|||2||1||0||1||44||42||+2||2||
|- bgcolor=#ffffff align=center
|3||align=left|||2||0||0||2||7||53||-46||0||
|}

Round 3 – 18–25 November 2006, Hong Kong 
All games in Hong Kong. Winner (Japan) qualifies directly to RWC 2007 as Asia 1. Runner up (Korea) advances to Repechage round as Asia 2, to play Tonga for Repechage 2.
The series was originally scheduled to be played in Sri Lanka.  However, security considerations prompted the series to be moved to Hong Kong.

{| class="wikitable"
|-
!width=30|Pos.
!width=100|Team
!width=30|P
!width=30|W
!width=30|D
!width=30|Lost
!width=30|For
!width=30|Ag.
!width=40|Diff.
!width=30|Points
!width=300|Notes
|-
|- bgcolor=#ccffcc align=center
|1||align=left|||2||2||0||0||106||3||+103||4|| Qualified to 2007 Rugby World Cup
|- bgcolor=#FFFFCC align=center
|2||align=left|||2||1||0||1||23||59||-36||2|| Qualified to RWC Qualif. repechage 
|- bgcolor=#ffffFF align=center
|3||align=left|||2||0||0||2||8||75||-67||0||
|}

Notes

External links
 World Cup website

2007
Asia
2005 in Asian rugby union
2006 in Asian rugby union